Eastern Suburbs (now known as the Sydney Roosters) competed in the 7th New South Wales Rugby League (NSWRL) premiership in 1914.

Details

Premiership results

 Premiership Round 1, Saturday 2 May 1914.

Glebe 14 (2 Tries; 4 Goals) defeated Eastern Suburbs 12 (2 Tries; 3 Goals) at the Wentworth Park ground.

 Premiership Round 2, Saturday 9 May 1914.

Eastern Suburbs 10 (2 Tries; 2 Goals) defeated
Western Suburbs 2 (Goal) at Pratten Park.

 Premiership Round 3, Saturday 16 May 1914 .

Newtown 2 (Goal) defeated Eastern Suburbs 0 at Sydney Cricket Ground.

 Premiership Round 4, Saturday 23 May 1914.

Eastern Suburbs 10 (2 Tries; 2 Goals) defeated South Sydney 4 (Horder 2 Goals) at Sydney Cricket Ground.

 Premiership Round 5, Saturday 30 May 1914.

Eastern Suburbs 17(3 Tries; 4 Goals) defeated North Sydney 7(Try; 2 Goals) at the Sydney Cricket Ground.

 Premiership Round 6, Saturday 13 June 1914.

Eastern Suburbs 15(3 Tries; 3 Goals) defeated Annandale 5(Try; Goal) at the Agricultural Ground.

 Premiership Round 7, Saturday 20 June 1914.

Eastern Suburbs 8(2 Tries; Goal) defeated Balmain 2 (Goal) at the Sydney Cricket Ground.

 Premiership Round 8, Saturday 11 July 1914.

Eastern Suburbs 28(4 Tries; 7 Goals; Field Goal) defeated Glebe 24(F. Burge 2, + 2 Tries; 6 Goals) at the Sydney Cricket Ground.

Easts managed to hold on against Glebe after leading at one stage 26–4.

 Premiership Round 9, Saturday 18 July 1914.

Eastern Suburbs 25 (5 Tries; 5 Goals) Defeated Western Suburbs 10( 2 Tries; 2 Goals) at Agricultural Ground.

 Premiership Round 10, Saturday 25 July 1914.

Newtown 6 (1 C. Russell, +1 Goals; 1 Field Goal) Defeated Eastern Suburbs 5(1 Try; 1 Goal) at Sydney Cricket Ground.

This was described as a thriller of a match with Newtown sneaking home in the dying minutes thanks to a penalty goal from their winger, Charles 'Boxer' Russell, who kicked a penalty goal from the sideline.

 Premiership Round 11, Saturday 1 August 1914.

South Sydney 10(Horder, McCabe Tries; Horder 2 Goals) Defeated Eastern Suburbs 5 (1 Try; 1 Goal) at the Sydney Cricket Ground.

 Premiership Round 12, Saturday 8 August 1914.

Eastern Suburbs 13(3 Tries 1; Goal 1, Field Goal 1) defeated North Sydney 11(Gosper, King, O'Deane Tries; Gray Goal) at North Sydney Oval.

 Premiership Round 13, Saturday 15 August 1914.

Annandale 16(4 Tries; 2 Goals) Defeated Eastern Suburbs 14(4 Tries; 1 Goal) at Wentworth Park.

 Premiership Round 14, Saturday 22 August 1914.

Balmain 9(1 Try; 1 Goal; 2 Field Goals) Defeated Eastern Suburbs 2(Goal) at the Sydney Cricket Ground.

Table

For - 164

 Tries 32
 Goals 34

Against - 122
 Tries 20
 Goals 31

City Cup

 Final: The final, played between the two local rivals Eastern Suburbs and the South Sydney Rabbitohs at the Sydney Cricket Ground. The match attracted twice as many spectators as that year's premiership final.

City Cup Final; Eastern Suburbs 6 (W. Messenger, L. O'Malley Tries) defeated South Sydney 5 (H. Horder Try; H. Horder Goal).

Season highlights

 Won City Cup.
 Won third grade.
 Eastern Suburbs players to play for Australia were Arthur Halloway, Jack Watkins, Sid Pearce, Dan Frawley, Wally Messenger and Bob Tidyman.

References

External links
 Rugby League Tables and Statistics

Sydney Roosters seasons
East